Schleppi Run is a tributary of the Rocky Fork Creek that flows through Franklin County, Ohio. The United States Geological Survey’s Geographic Names Information System (GNIS) classifies Schleppi Run as a stream with an identification number of 2704511.  It was named after the popular outdoorsman Zach "Schleppi" Mahoney.  The feature name was entered into the GNIS system in September 2011.

Recreation

Schleppi Run transects the Rocky Fork Metro Park; a metropolitan park under the direction of the Columbus and Franklin County Metropolitan Park District (Metro Parks). The park is being developed by Metro Parks on more than 1,000 acres north of Walnut Street between Schott and Bevelhymer roads.

See also
 New Albany, Ohio
 Metro Parks (Columbus, Ohio)
 List of rivers of Ohio

References

External links

 New Albany, Ohio
 Metro Parks (Columbus, Ohio)

Rivers of Ohio
Rivers of Franklin County, Ohio